Dziadowa Kłoda  is a village in Oleśnica County, Lower Silesian Voivodeship, in south-western Poland. It is the seat of the administrative district (gmina) called Gmina Dziadowa Kłoda.

References

Villages in Oleśnica County